Archbishop Carroll High School is a Roman Catholic Christian high school with an emphasis on social justice and civic engagement located in the Brookland Neighborhood of Northeast Washington, D.C., serving students from around the Washington Metropolitan Area. It is owned and operated by the Archdiocese of Washington, is part of the Washington Catholic Athletic Conference, and is affiliated with the Catholic University of America through its dual-enrollment program.

History
Archbishop Carroll High School opened in 1951 and expressed the vision of Patrick A. O'Boyle, the first archbishop of the Archdiocese of Washington, who felt strongly that the Catholic Church should lead by example in the area of integration. Named in honor of John Carroll, the first Catholic archbishop in the United States, the school offered a college preparatory education for young men, regardless of race or ethnicity.  For its first 40 years, the Augustinian Friars operated Archbishop Carroll.

In 1989, the Archdiocese of Washington merged all four of its high schools—boys' schools, Archbishop Carroll and Mackin, and girls' schools, All Saints and Holy Spirit—into one school on the Archbishop Carroll site. 

From 2009-2019, Archbishop Carroll High School participated as an International Baccalaureate World School and offered the IB Diploma Programme.

As of the 2019-2020 School Year, Archbishop Carroll High School has transitioned to pre-Advanced Placement (PreAP) and Advanced Placement (AP) coursework.

Notable alumni

Jeremiah Attaochu (2010), defensive end for the Denver Broncos
Ruben Boumtje-Boumtje (1997), former Georgetown University and NBA basketball player and executive 
Michael A. Brown (1985), politician (at-large council member on the D.C. City Council) and convicted felon.
Austin Carr (Mackin, 1967), former Notre Dame and NBA player
Johnny Dawkins (Mackin, 1982), former Duke University and NBA player and current head coach at the University of Central Florida
Roger Fairfax (1990), legal scholar, Dean of the American University Washington College of Law, and Chair of the Board of Directors of Archbishop Carroll High School in Washington, D.C. 
Marvin Graves (1989), former Syracuse University and CFL football player
Bernard Griffith (Mackin), Dallas Mavericks assistant coach, head basketball coach at Dillard University, and national champion high school head coach
Rich Harrison (1993), music producer
Tom Hoover (1959), Villanova University and pro basketball player, first-round pick in 1963 NBA draft
Joe Johnson (1981), played football for Washington Redskins, Minnesota Vikings
Eddie Jordan (1973), former National Basketball Association player, head coach
Kris Joseph (2008), Boston Celtics basketball player
Jevon Langford (1992), defensive end for Cincinnati Bengals
Derrick Lewis (1984), professional basketball player
Mike Lonergan (1984), Former basketball head coach Catholic University of America, University of Vermont, and George Washington University
Edward Malloy (1959), 16th president of University of Notre Dame
Rodney McGruder (2005-2008) professional basketball player for the Detroit Pistons. He played college basketball for Kansas State Wildcats.
Lawrence Moten (1991), played basketball for Syracuse University
Martin Puryear (1959), artist known for devotion to traditional craft
Boyd Rutherford (1974), Republican Lieutenant Governor of Maryland
Michael S. Steele (1977), former chairman of Republican National Committee, former Lieutenant Governor of Maryland
John Thompson, Jr. (1960), Boston Celtics, Georgetown University basketball coach
Robert White (2000),  Democratic at-large seat on the Council of the District of Columbia
Jamal Williams (1994), former defensive tackle for the San Diego Chargers and Denver Broncos

References

External links
 

Catholic secondary schools in Washington, D.C.
Educational institutions established in 1951
International Baccalaureate schools in Washington, D.C.
1951 establishments in Washington, D.C.
Catholic University of America